The 1983–84 All-Ireland Senior Club Hurling Championship was the 14th staging of the All-Ireland Senior Club Hurling Championship, the Gaelic Athletic Association's premier inter-county club hurling tournament. The championship ended on 3 June 1984.

Loughgiel Shamrocks from Antrim were the defending champions, however, they failed to qualify after being beaten by Ballycastle McQuillans in the Antrim Championship.

On 3 June 1984, Ballyhale Shamrocks won the championship after a 1-10 to 0-07 defeat of Gort in an All-Ireland final replay. It was their second All-Ireland title overall and their first in three years.

Results

Connacht Senior Club Hurling Championship

Second round

Semi-final

Final

Leinster Senior Club Hurling Championship

First round

Quarter-finals

Semi-finals

Final

Munster Senior Club Hurling Championship

Quarter-finals

Semi-finals

Finals

Ulster Senior Club Hurling Championship

Final

All-Ireland Senior Club Hurling Championship

Quarter-final

Semi-finals

Final

Championship statistics

Top Scorers

Top scorers overall

Miscellaneous

 At the end of the drawn All-Ireland final, both sets of players from Ballyhale Shamrocks and Gort refused to play extra-time and insisted on a replay.

References

1982 in hurling
1983 in hurling
All-Ireland Senior Club Hurling Championship